John Oates Bower (14 October 1901 in Shelburne, Nova Scotia, Canada – 16 January 1981 in Sandy Point, Nova Scotia) was a Canadian politician, businessman and executive. He was elected to the House of Commons of Canada in 1965 as a Member of the Progressive Conservative Party to represent the riding of Shelburne—Yarmouth—Clare. He was previously defeated in the 1963 election.

Bower worked as a geologist for Mobil-affiliated companies Columbian Petroleum and Colsag. He retired from that business in 1969, the year after he left federal politics due to poor health.

References

External links
 

1901 births
1981 deaths
Members of the House of Commons of Canada from Nova Scotia
Progressive Conservative Party of Canada MPs
Candidates in the 1963 Canadian federal election
20th-century Canadian geologists